Buttstädt is a municipality in the district of Sömmerda, in Thuringia, Germany. It is situated 16 km northeast of Weimar. The former municipalities Ellersleben, Eßleben-Teutleben, Großbrembach, Guthmannshausen, Hardisleben, Kleinbrembach, Mannstedt, Olbersleben and Rudersdorf were merged into Buttstädt in January 2019.

History
Within the German Empire (1871-1918), Buttstädt was part of the Grand Duchy of Saxe-Weimar-Eisenach.

Personalities

Honorary citizen 
 Ernst Behr (1847–1929), evangelical superintendent

Sons and daughters of the town 
 Heinrich Graefe (1802–1868), educator
 Ortrun Wenkel (born 1942), opera singer
 Henry Lauterbach (born 1957), athlete in long jump and high jump

People connected to Buttstädt 
 Johann Samuel Schröter (1735–1808), theologian
 Johannes Enke (1899–1945), communist, resistance fighter against the Nazi regime, Nazi victim

References

Sömmerda (district)
Grand Duchy of Saxe-Weimar-Eisenach